Josef Panáček (8 September 1937 – 5 April 2022) was a Czechoslovak sport shooter and Olympic Champion. He won a gold medal in skeet shooting at the 1976 Summer Olympics in Montreal.

References

External links
 

1937 births
2022 deaths
People from Staré Město (Uherské Hradiště District)
Skeet shooters
Czech male sport shooters
Czechoslovak male sport shooters
Olympic shooters of Czechoslovakia
Olympic gold medalists for Czechoslovakia
Shooters at the 1976 Summer Olympics
Shooters at the 1980 Summer Olympics
Olympic medalists in shooting
Medalists at the 1976 Summer Olympics
Sportspeople from the Zlín Region